David Alexander Mitchell (born 20 February 1980) is a former English cricketer.  Mitchell is a left-handed batsman who bowls right-arm medium-fast.  He was born at Carshalton, Surrey.

Mitchell played a single List A match for Devon in the 2nd round of the 2003 Cheltenham & Gloucester Trophy against Cumberland which was played in 2002 at The Maer Ground in Exmouth.  He scored 10 runs in the match before being dismissed by Marcus Sharp.  With the ball he bowled two wicketless overs.

References

External links
David Mitchell at Cricinfo
David Mitchell at CricketArchive

1980 births
Living people
Cricketers from Carshalton
English cricketers
Devon cricketers